Robbins may refer to:

People 
 Robbins (name), a surname

Fictional characters
 Al Robbins, medical doctor in CSI: Crime Scene Investigation
 Arizona Robbins, surgeon in Grey's Anatomy
 Ashley Mizuki Robbins, protagonist in the video games Another Code: Two Memories and Another Code: R – A Journey into Lost Memories
 Jack Robbins, character on EastEnders television series
 Lily Robbins, character in The Lily Series
 Parker Robbins, comic book character

Places 
Antarctica
 Robbins Hill, a hill at the terminus of Blue Glacier

Australia
 Robbins Passage and Boullanger Bay Important Bird Area, Tasmania

USA
 Robbins, California, town in Sutter County
 Robbins, Illinois, village in Cook County
 Robbins, Michigan, an unincorporated community
 Robbins, Missouri, an unincorporated community
 Robbins, North Carolina, city in Moore County
 Robbins, Tennessee, unincorporated community in Scott County
Robbins, Virginia, ghost town

Other 
 Baskin-Robbins, American chain of ice cream parlors 
 Bernie Robbins Stadium, Atlantic City, New Jersey, US
 Robbins Entertainment, American dance music record label
 Robbins v. Lower Merion School District, case concerning alleged school spying through students' laptop webcams, USA
 Robbins, a 1986 British TV programme featuring Kate Robbins and her siblings

See also 
 Robins (disambiguation)
 Robbin (disambiguation)